The women's 150 metre individual medley swimming events for the 2016 Summer Paralympics take place at the Rio Olympic Stadium on 12 September. Only one event was contested for one classification.

Competition format
Each event consists of two rounds: heats and final. The top eight swimmers overall in the heats progress to the final. If there are eight or fewer swimmers in an event, no heats are held and all swimmers qualify for the final.

Results

SM4

17:58 12 September 2016:

References

Swimming at the 2016 Summer Paralympics